Oughtonhead Common is a 17.4 hectare Local Nature Reserve in the Westmill district of Hitchin, Hertfordshire. It is owned and managed by North Hertfordshire District Council.

The River Oughton flows along the edge of the site, which has a wide variety of habitats. It is grazed by English Longhorn cattle, and there is a football pitch. The Friends of Oughtonhead Common assist with maintaining the site. It is part of the Chilterns Area of Outstanding Natural Beauty.

References

External links
Oughtonhead Common, Countryside Management Service

Parks and open spaces in Hertfordshire
Local Nature Reserves in Hertfordshire
Hitchin